Dornhoefer, Dornhöfer is a German surname. Notable people with the surname include:

 Gary Dornhoefer (born 1943), Canadian ice hockey player
 Sabrina Dornhoefer (born 1963), American long-distance runner

German toponymic surnames